This is a list of releases by Material.

Studio albums

Live albums

EPs

Singles

Remix albums

Compilation albums

Collections
1991: Axiom Collection: Illuminations – contains "Cosmic Slop"
1993: Axiom Collection II: Manifestation – contains "Mantra" [Doors of Perception Mix] and "Playin' with Fire" [Praxis Remix / Edit]
1995: Axion Funk: Funkcronomicon – contains "Cosmic Slop"
1996: Axiom Dub: Mysteries of Creation – contains "Ghost Light / Dread Recall"
1996: Altered Beats: Assassin Knowledges of the Remanipulated – contains "3D-Cut Transmission"
1996: Tetragramton: Submerge – contains "Turn the Screw" by Material with Graham Haynes, and "Active Code" by Material with Byard Lancaster
1996: Myth: Dreams of the World – contains "Hermes" by Material with Umar Bin Hassan, and "Apollo" by Material with Abiodun Oyewole
1997: Asana – contains "Mantra"
1998: The Best of Material - contains 13 tracks from the Celluoid era 1979-1984
1998: Abstract Depressionism – contains "Downward"
2000: Asana 2: Moving Meditation – contains "Devata"

Collaborations
This list features recordings that at least in part explicitly credits Material, and features production, writing and/or performance by members of the Material collective.
1982: Tribe 2 – "What I Like" – 12" single
1982: Phase II – "The Roxy" – 12" single
1983: D.ST. – "Crazy Cuts" – 12" single
1983: Lenny White – Attitude – tracks "My Turn to Love You"
1983: Herbie Hancock – Future Shock
1983: Herbie Hancock- "Rockit" – 7" & 12" single
1983: Herbie Hancock – "Future Shock" / "Earth Beat" – 12" single
1983: Herbie Hancock – "Autodrive" / "Chameleon" – 12" single
1983: Fab Five Freddy – "Une Sale Histoire: Part 1 & Part 2" – 12" single
1983: Nona Hendryx – Nona
1983: Nona Hendryx – "Transformation" – 12" single
1984: Bill Laswell – Baselines
1984: Yellowman – King Yellowman – tracks "Strong Me Strong" and "Disco Reggae"
1984: Yellowman – "Strong Me Strong" – 12" single
1984: Gil Scott-Heron – "Re-Ron" – 7" and 12" single
1984: Timezone featuring Afrika Bambaataa and John Lydon – "World Destruction" – 7" and 12" single
1984: Fab Five Freddy – "Change the Beat" – 7" and 12" single
1984: Herbie Hancock – Sound-System
1984: Herbie Hancock – "Metal Beat" – 12" single
1984: Herbie Hancock – "Hard Rock" – 12" single
1984: Shango featuring Afrika Bambaataa – Shango Funk Theology
1984: Shango featuring Afrika Bambaataa – "Zulu Groove" – 12" single
1984: Shango featuring Afrika Bambaataa – "Shango Message" – 12" single
1984: Nona Hendryx – The Art of Defense
1984: Nona Hendryx – "I Sweat" – 12" single
1984: Nona Hendryx – "To the Bone" – 12" single
1984: Genji Sawai – Sowaka
1984: Yla-Mago – "TVO-Rock" – 12" single
1985: The Last Poets – Oh my People
1985: The Last Poets – "Get Movin'" – 12" single
1985: Deadline featuring Manu Dibango – Down by Law
1985: B-Side – Cairo Nights – tracks "Change the Beat" and "What I Like (American Dreams)"
1985: Manu Dibango – Electric Africa
1985: Manu Dibango – "Pata Piya" – 12" single
1985: Mick Jagger – She's the Boss
1985: Mick Jagger – "Just Another Night" – 12" single
1985: Mick Jagger – "Lucky in Love" – 12" single
1985: Sly and Robbie – Language Barrier
1985: Sly and Robbie – "Bass and Trouble" – 12" single
1985: Sly and Robbie – "Get to This, Get to That" – 12" single
1985: Public Image Ltd. – Album / Compact Disc / Cassette
1986: Ginger Baker – Horses and Trees
1986: Toshinori Kondo – Konton
1986: Manu Dibango – Afrijazzy – tracks "Makossa "87 / Big Blow"
1986: Manu Dibango – "Makossa '87" – 7" single
1987: Sly and Robbie – Rhythm Killers – 12" single
1987: Sly and Robbie – "Boops (Here to Go)" – 12" single
1987: Sly and Robbie – "Fire" – 12" single
1987: Afrika Bambaataa and Family – The Light
1988: Gettovetts – Missionaries Moving
1988: Gettovetts – "Battle Call" – 12" single
1988: Herbie Hancock – Perfect Machine
1988: Herbie Hancock – "Vibe Alive" – 12" single
1989: Nicky Skopelitis – Next to Nothing
1992: Manu Dibango – Bao Bao

References
General

 

Notes

Material
Rock music group discographies